The Renbæk Prison is an open prison in Denmark located in Renbæk, 10 km. east of Skaerbaek.

The site originally housed a camp for young unemployed people in 1943 but was temporarily taken over by the Prison and Probation Service to house inmates from the open government work house program. The prison was taken over by the German occupiers, and in 1946 it was converted into a real state prison. During the 1960s, the majority of its present buildings were built on the site.

Of the prisons 160 seats only 14 is in double cells. Prison offers a range of courses, particularly in agriculture and forestry.

External links 
 About the Prison

Renbaek
1943 establishments in Denmark
1946 establishments in Denmark